VA-30 may refer to:
Attack Squadron 30 (U.S. Navy)
State Route 30 (Virginia)
VA-30 (Valladolid), a highway in Spain